Bobby Álvarez (born 20 August 1955) is a Puerto Rican basketball player. He competed in the men's tournament at the 1976 Summer Olympics.

References

External links

1955 births
Living people
Puerto Rican men's basketball players
Olympic basketball players of Puerto Rico
Basketball players at the 1976 Summer Olympics
Place of birth missing (living people)